Emily Elizabeth Westwood (born 5 April 1984) is an English football player. She is an attacking midfielder for England women and Birmingham City Ladies, but has filled in as an emergency defender when needed. She has represented her country at U-16, U-19 and U-21 levels, as well as gaining full international honours, including appearances at the UEFA Women's Championships in 2005 and 2009.

In May 2009, Westwood was one of the first 17 female players to be given central contracts by The Football Association.

Club career
In December 2010, Westwood was revealed to have signed for Birmingham City Ladies' FA WSL squad. With Birmingham she finished as runner-up in the 2011 and 2012 FA WSL seasons and won the 2011–12 FA Women's Cup. She also featured in two UEFA Women's Champions League campaigns. In January 2016 she extended her contract with the club.

International career
Westwood made her senior debut for England in a 4–1 home friendly win over Italy in February 2005.

International goals
Scores and results list England's goal tally first.

Honours
FA Women's Cup: 2
2009–10, 2011–12
FA Women's Premier League Cup: 1
2007–08

References

External links

 Emily Westwood at the FA website
 Emily Westwood at Birmingham City Ladies

English women's footballers
Everton F.C. (women) players
Birmingham City W.F.C. players
England women's international footballers
England women's under-23 international footballers
FA Women's National League players
1984 births
Living people
Women's Super League players
Women's association football midfielders
Wolverhampton Wanderers W.F.C. players
England women's youth international footballers
Sportspeople from Dudley